The 1972–73 season was Newport County's 11th consecutive season in the Football League Fourth Division since relegation at the end of the  1961–62 season and their 45th overall in the Football League. County missed out on promotion by the narrowest of margins: their goal average of 1.46 being inferior to that of Aldershot's 1.58 – both teams having finished level on points.

Season review

Results summary

Results by round

Fixtures and results

Fourth Division

FA Cup

Football League Cup

Welsh Cup

League table

Notes

References

 Amber in the Blood: A History of Newport County.

External links
 Newport County 1972-1973 : Results
 Newport County football club match record: 1973
 Welsh Cup 1972/73

1972-73
English football clubs 1972–73 season
1972–73 in Welsh football